The Ukraine men's national artistic gymnastics team represents Ukraine in FIG international competitions.

History
Ukraine has made six appearances in the men's team competition at the Olympic Games and has won two medals.  They debuted at the 1996 Olympic Games after the fall of the Soviet Union.

Senior roster

Junior roster

Team competition results

Olympic Games
 1928 through 1992 — participated as the Soviet Union
 1996 —  bronze medal
 Ihor Korobchynskyi, Oleg Kosiak, Grigory Misutin, Vladimir Shamenko, Rustam Sharipov, Olexander Svitlichni, Yuri Yermakov
 2000 —  silver medal
 Oleksandr Beresh, Valeri Goncharov, Ruslan Myezyentsev, Valeri Pereshkura, Olexander Svitlichni, Roman Zozulya
 2004 — 7th place
 Evgeni Bogonosyuk, Valeri Goncharov, Vadym Kuvakin, Ruslan Myezyentsev, Andrei Mykaylichenko, Roman Zozulya
 2008 — did not qualify a full team
 2012 — 4th place
 Nikolai Kuksenkov, Vitaliy Nakonechnyi, Igor Radivilov, Oleg Stepko, Oleg Vernyayev
 2016 — 8th place
 Vladyslav Hryko, Igor Radivilov, Maksym Semiankiv, Andriy Sienichkin, Oleg Vernyayev
 2020 — 7th place
 Illia Kovtun, Petro Pakhniuk, Igor Radivilov, Yevhen Yudenkov

World Championships

 1934 through 1991 — participated as the Soviet Union
 1994 —  bronze medal
 Rustam Charipov, Yuri Ermakov, Igor Korobchinski, Vitaly Marinich, Grigori Misutin, Vladimir Shamenko, Andrei Stepanchenko
 1995 — 5th place
 Rustam Sharipov, Vladimir Chamenko, Alexander Svetlichnyi, Yuri Ermakov, Igor Korobchinski, Grigory Misutin, Oleg Kosiak
 1997 — 

 1999 — 
 
 2001 —  bronze medal
 Alexander Beresh, Sergei Vyaltsev, Roman Zozulya, Andrei Lipsky, Ruslan Mezentsev, Andrei Mikhailichenko
 2003 — 8th place
 Ruslan Mezentsev, Roman Zozulya, Alexander Svetlichnyi, Alexander Beresch, Valery Goncharov, Sergei Vyaltsev
 2006 —
 
 2007 — 
 
 2010 — 13th (qualifications)
 
 2011 — 5th place
 Mykola Kuksenkov, Vitaly Nakonechny, Oleg Stepko, Igor Radivilov, Roman Zozulya, Oleg Verniaiev
 2014 — 9th (qualifications)
 Georgii Petrosian, Igor Radivilov, Maksym Semiankiv, Andrii Sienichkin, Oleg Verniaiev, Mykyta Yermak
 2015 – 12th (qualifications)
 Vladyslav Hryko, Volodymyr Okachev, Igor Radivilov, Maksym Semiankiv, Oleg Verniaiev, Mykyta Yermak
 2018 — 9th (qualifications)
 Vladyslav Hryko, Petro Pakhniuk, Igor Radivilov, Maksym Vasylenko, Oleg Verniaiev
 2019 — 8th place
 Vladyslav Hryko, Petro Pakhniuk, Igor Radivilov, Oleg Verniaiev, Yevgen Yudenkov
 2022 — 21st place (qualifications)
 Pantely Kolodii, Illia Kovtun, Mykyta Melnykov, Igor Radivilov, Bogdan Suprun

Junior World Championships
 2019  —  silver medal
 Nazar Chepurnyi, Volodymyr Kostiuk, Illia Kovtun, Dmytro Shyshko

Most decorated gymnasts
This list includes all Ukrainian male artistic gymnasts who have won at least three medals at the Olympic Games and the World Artistic Gymnastics Championships combined or at least one individual medal.  Not included are medals won as part of the Soviet Union or Unified Teams.

Gallery

See also  
 Ukraine women's national gymnastics team
 List of Olympic male artistic gymnasts for Ukraine

References 

Gymnastics in Ukraine
National men's artistic gymnastics teams
Gymnastics